Gambling with the Devil is the twelfth studio album by German power metal band Helloween, released in Japan on 24 October 2007, and in Europe on 26 October. The single "As Long as I Fall" is download-only and was released in late September.

When asked about the album, bassist Markus Grosskopf commented:

Track listing

Critical reception

The album has received mostly positive reviews, with critics hailing it as one of the band's strongest efforts in quite a while.
Andi Deris' vocals on the album also got praise for their power, range and emotion.

Personnel
Band members
Andi Deris – lead vocals
Michael Weikath – guitar
Sascha Gerstner – guitar, backing vocals
Markus Grosskopf – bass
Dani Löble – drums

Guests
Biff Byford - spoken vocals on "Crack the Riddle"
Matthias Ulmer - keyboards

Charts

References

2007 albums
Helloween albums
SPV/Steamhammer albums
Albums produced by Charlie Bauerfeind